Arbor Hill is an unincorporated community or ghost town in Adair County, Iowa, United States.

Geography
It is located on County Road P28, south of Stuart, at 41.366543N, -94.317809W.

History

A post office was established at Arbor Hill in 1857, the name was changed to Arborhill in 1895, and the post office closed in 1907.

Arbor Hill's population was 58 in 1902. The community was once home to the Arbor Hill Co-Operative Creamery Company, a blacksmith shop, and a general store; the Port Union Mill dam was located one half mile west of Arbor Hill, on the Middle River. The community (at that time known as Arborhill) was the site of the Seventh Annual Old Settlers and Old Soldiers Reunion, held on August 12, 13, and 14, 1908.

The Methodist church in Greenfield, constructed in 1877, was built from lumber cut near Arbor Hill. The Fairview Cemetery was established in Arbor Hill in 1876; the cemetery and church are located north of the townsite.

Arborhill's population was 68 in 1924. The 1930 plat book of Adair County shows Arbor Hill platted in the southeast quadrant of Section 20 of Harrison Township, with the community covering one quarter square mile. 

Arbor Hill's population was 12 in 1940. 

In 2018, the Arbor Hill Wind Farm project began, with the MidAmerican Energy Company building enough wind turbines in Arbor Hill and nearby Orient to power 230,000 homes.

See also
 Berea, Iowa

References

External links
  Arbor Hill, Iowa on Iowa Ghost Towns

Unincorporated communities in Adair County, Iowa
Unincorporated communities in Iowa
Populated places established in 1857
1857 establishments in Iowa